Samuel Wainer (December 19, 1910 – September 2, 1980) was a Brazilian journalist and author. Wainer was born into a Jewish family from Bessarabia, more precisely in the Edineț District, then part of the Russian Empire. His family immigrated to Brazil in 1912, settling in São Paulo. He would later found and direct the Diretrizes magazine and the Última Hora newspaper. He was married to Danuza Leão, Brazilian journalist and model, sister of Nara Leão. They had a son, Samuel Wainer Filho, who was also a journalist. He died in 1984 in a car accident with a camera operator. Wainer also had two more children: plastic artist Débora "Pinky" Wainer and film producer Bruno Wainer.

He was a reporter of Diários Associados in 1950, when he interviewed Getúlio Vargas, with whom he would later keep a close friendship. He also faced strong opposition from Carlos Lacerda and Assis Chateaubriand (owner of Diários Associados) during his career, specially when he founded his own newspaper, that would openly support Vargas presidency.

Wainer was the only Brazilian and Latin American journalist present at the Nuremberg Trials.

He died in São Paulo, aged 69.

Bibliography 
 Minha razão de viver - memórias de um repórter (Editora Planeta)

References 

1910 births
1980 deaths
Brazilian non-fiction writers
Brazilian journalists
Brazilian people of Russian-Jewish descent
Jewish Brazilian writers
Writers from São Paulo
20th-century journalists